Miconia poecilantha is a species of plant in the family Melastomataceae. It is endemic to Colombia.

References

poecilantha
Endangered plants
Endemic flora of Colombia
Taxonomy articles created by Polbot